Peykaap can refer to the following ship classes
 , a torpedo boat class of the Navy of the Islamic Revolutionary Guard Corps
 , a missile boat class of the Navy of the Islamic Revolutionary Guard Corps 
 , a missile boat class of the Navy of the Islamic Revolutionary Guard Corps